Karya (Greek: Καρυά) is a former municipality on the island of Lefkada, Ionian Islands, Greece. Since the 2011 local government reform it is part of the municipality Lefkada, of which it is a municipal unit. It lies in the central part of Lefkada. It has a land area of 30.867 km2 and a population of 871 (2011 census). A large part of the population live in the former municipal seat, the town of Karyá (pop. 589).

The village Karya is located on the slopes of Pyrgos at 500 m above sea level.  The highest point in the municipal unit is the mountain Stavrota, elevation 1,158 m. There are four villages in the municipal unit: Karyá, Pigadisánoi (pop. 157), Egklouví (106), and Ammókampos (19).

Subdivisions
The municipal unit Karya is subdivided into the following communities (constituent villages in brackets):
Egklouvi (Egklouvi, Ammokampos)
Karya
Pigadisanoi

Population

Notable people 
Apostolos Kaklamanis (1936-) politician

See also
List of settlements in the Lefkada regional unit

References

External links
Official website 
Karya (municipality) on GTP Travel Pages (in English and Greek)
Karya (village) on GTP Travel Pages (in English and Greek)

Populated places in Lefkada (regional unit)